The 1975 Wildwater Canoeing World Championships was the 9th edition of the global wildwater canoeing competition, Wildwater Canoeing World Championships, organised by the International Canoe Federation.

Podiums

K1

C1

C2

Medal table

See also
 Wildwater canoeing

References

External links
 

Wildwater Canoeing World Championships